Aani Ver is a 1981 Indian Tamil-language drama film directed by K. Vijayan and produced by Thiruppur Mani under Vivekananda Pictures, starring Sivakumar and Saritha. It was released on 10 April 1981.

Plot 

A lower-caste village girl clears her Union Public Service Commission examination and becomes a collector. But her husband is illiterate, creating great difficulties as the girl tries to perform her social and official roles. Unable to resolve this tension, she quits her job to remain as his dutiful wife.

Cast 
 Saritha as Arukkani
 Sivakumar as Raman
 Sathyaraj as Malaimannan
 Poornam Viswanathan
 S. N. Lakshmi as Sellakalai
 S. S. Chandran

Soundtrack 
The soundtrack, consisting of three songs – "Muthu Muthu Therottam", "Mani Adicha Soru" and "Naan Thane Oru Pudhu Kavithai" – was composed by Shankar–Ganesh. The third song is based on "Rasputin" by Boney M.

Release and reception 
Aani Ver was released on 10 April 1981. Reviewing the film for the magazine Idhayam Pesigirathu, the future Tamil Nadu chief minister J. Jayalalithaa was critical of the climax scene where the heroine sacrifices her employment to aid her husband. Nalini Sastry of Kalki felt Viswanathan was underutilised, but appreciated the dialogues.

References

External links 
 

1980s Tamil-language films
1981 drama films
Films directed by K. Vijayan
Films scored by Shankar–Ganesh
Indian drama films